This is the list of all the presidents of Sicily since 1947.

There has been 24 elected presidents by Regional Council (1947-2001), and 4 directly elected presidents since 2001.

Elected by the Regional Council (1947–2001)

Directly-elected presidents (since 2001)

References

 
Politics of Sicily
Sicily